American History: A Survey is a textbook first published in 1961 that was written initially by the historians Richard N. Current, T. Harry Williams, and Frank Freidel and later by Alan Brinkley, the Allan Nevins professor of history at Columbia University. The book provides an account of United States history spanning from the arrival of Christopher Columbus to the age of globalization in the most recent editions. As of December 2014, the current edition is the 14th published in 2011.

This textbook has been commonly used in AP United States History classes and in college survey courses.

Content
American History: A Survey is organized in a way that reflects a high school-level U.S. history course. The chapters follow the nation's history chronologically.

In the preface to the book, Brinkley states his purpose is "to be a thorough, balanced, and versatile account of America's past that instructors and students will find accessible and appropriate no matter what approach to the past a course chooses."

American History: A Survey includes supplemental features such as "Where Historians Disagree" essays. The text also incorporates full-color maps with captions and chapter introductions that focus on the main themes of the chapter.

Usage
In 2004, American History: A Survey was found to be used in 14 of 258 U.S. history survey college courses, which made it the fifth most popular textbook. At universities (as opposed to community and junior colleges) it was the fourth most popular textbook.

Editions
 1st edition, 1961, 
 2nd edition, 1966
 3rd edition, 1971
 4th edition, 1974,  
 5th edition, 1979
 6th edition, 1983
 7th edition, 1986
 8th edition, 1991, 
 9th edition, 1997
 10th edition, 1999, 
 11th edition, 2003, 
 12th edition, 2007, 
 13th edition, 2009, 
 14th edition, 2011,

References

External links
 American History: A Survey (13th ed.) student companion site
 American History: A Survey (12th ed.) site
 American History: A Survey (11th ed.) student companion site
 American History: A Survey (10th ed.)
 American History: A Survey (9th ed.) site
 American History: A Survey (1st ed.) digitized

1961 non-fiction books
History books about the United States